A calciumopathy is a disease caused by
disruption to the use of calcium within a cell.
To a large extent, a calciumopathy is a type of channelopathy, or a
disease caused by disturbed function of ion channel subunits or the
proteins that regulate them; calciumopathies also include
dysfunctions of regulatory pathways and mitochondria. Many
calciumopathies are complex polygenic diseases; clues to their
understanding are coming from the rarer monogenic forms of common
symptoms such as seizures, ataxia, and
migraine.

References 

Channelopathies